Shawn Collins (born February 20, 1967) is a former professional American football wide receiver in the National Football League. He was drafted by the Atlanta Falcons in the first round of the 1989 NFL Draft. He played college football at Northern Arizona.

Collins also played for the Cleveland Browns, Green Bay Packers and Frankfurt Galaxy.  He played in the Canadian Football League in 1995 for the Winnipeg Blue Bombers and the Memphis Mad Dogs.

References

1967 births
Living people
Players of American football from San Diego
Players of Canadian football from San Diego
American football wide receivers
Northern Arizona Lumberjacks football players
Atlanta Falcons players
Cleveland Browns players
Green Bay Packers players
Tampa Bay Buccaneers players
Frankfurt Galaxy players
Iowa Barnstormers players
Memphis Mad Dogs players
Kearny High School (California) alumni
was pasiert

wa paiert